The Best of The Kentucky Headhunters: Still Pickin' is a greatest hits album released by American southern rock/country rock band The Kentucky Headhunters. It was the first album collection of hits from the band's career up to that point. The album includes tracks from their first three studio albums, as well as "Let's Work Together" (from the soundtrack to Harley Davidson and the Marlboro Man) and a cover of "You've Got to Hide Your Love Away."

Content
The album reprises tracks from the band's first three albums. "Dumas Walker", "Walk Softly on This Heart of Mine", "Rock 'n' Roll Angel" and "Oh Lonesome Me" are from The Kentucky Headhunters' 1989 debut Pickin' on Nashville; "The Ballad of Davy Crockett", "Only Daddy That'll Walk the Line", "It's Chitlin' Time" and a cover of Norman Greenbaum's "Spirit in the Sky" from Electric Barnyard; and "Honky Tonk Walkin'", "Dixie Fried" and "Redneck Girl" from Rave On!!. "Let's Work Together" was originally included on the soundtrack to the film Harley Davidson and the Marlboro Man, and a cover of The Beatles' "You've Got to Hide Your Love Away" was also included on the 1994 tribute album Shared Vision: The Songs of the Beatles.

Track listing

Personnel
The Kentucky Headhunters
Greg Martin – electric guitar, slide guitar, background vocals
Doug Phelps – bass guitar, background vocalsA
Ricky Lee Phelps – lead vocals, harmonica, percussionA
Fred Young – drums, percussion, background vocals
Richard Young – rhythm guitar, background vocals
Anthony Kenney – bass guitar, background vocalsB
Mark S. Orr – lead vocals, background vocalsB
APerformed only on tracks 1-9.
BPerformed only on tracks 10-13.
Additional musicians
David Wayne Jessie – tambourine on "Honky Tonk Walkin'"
Richard Ripani – piano on "Honky Tonk Walkin'"

1994 compilation albums
The Kentucky Headhunters albums
Mercury Records compilation albums